The Women's Press Club was created in 1943 as a response to women being prohibited from membership of the males-only London Press Club. “As the men won't have us, we should have a club of our own", said The Times reporter Phyllis Deakin, who initiated the club with these words. Phyllis Davies, crime writer on the Daily Mail, was reported to have responded, “Good idea. You'd better organise it.”

Sixty-two women met at the Falstaff pub in Fleet Street and formed the club, whose headquarters were at 53 Carey Street, London.  Phyllis Deakin was its first chair. Its initial AGM was held on 31 October 1944; the first president was Lady Margaret Rhondda, with Phyllis Davies as vice-chair and Hilda Grosvenor as secretary. The club continued to 1972.

References

Professional associations for women
1943 establishments in the United Kingdom